East Park is a neighborhood in Greenville, South Carolina. It is located immediately north to, and adjacent of, the downtown business district. This neighborhood is part of the East Park Avenue Historic District that was listed in the National Register of Historic Places in October 2005.

Subdivided in 1910, the area reached its height of development in the 1920s and 1930s.

References
City of Greenville, South Carolina historic districts featuring East Park Avenue. - accessed 27 June 2010.
Livingplaces.com article on Greenville, South Carolina's East Park Historic District. - accessed 27 June 2010.

Neighborhoods in Greenville, South Carolina